Jonathan Sim (born September 29, 1977) is a Canadian former professional ice hockey left winger who played in the National Hockey League (NHL).  He was drafted by the Dallas Stars in the third round (70th overall) of the 1996 NHL Entry Draft.

Playing career
As a veteran journeyman of the National Hockey League, Sim moved to play his first full professional season in Europe in 2011–12. After an unsuccessful stint in the Czech Extraliga, Sim was signed by Eisbären Berlin of the Deutsche Eishockey Liga, where he helped contribute to the team's 6th league championship.

On his return to North America and the 2012–13 NHL lockout negating his chance of a NHL contract, Sim was signed to a professional try-out deal with the San Antonio Rampage of the AHL on December 7, 2012. Over the course of his try-out, Sim contributed with 13 points in 22 games, before opting not to renew with the Rampage to be mutually released on January 28, 2013. On January 31, 2013, Sim was signed to a professional try-out deal with the Adirondack Phantoms of the AHL. On November 4, 2013, Sim signed a professional tryout with the Bridgeport Sound Tigers. He ended up playing 14 games with the Sound Tigers, scoring 2 goals and adding 2 assists.

Awards and honours

Career statistics

References

External links

 

1977 births
Adirondack Phantoms players
Atlanta Thrashers players
Bridgeport Sound Tigers players
Canadian ice hockey left wingers
Dallas Stars draft picks
Dallas Stars players
Eisbären Berlin players
Florida Panthers players
HC Fribourg-Gottéron players
Ice hockey people from Nova Scotia
Kalamazoo Wings (1974–2000) players
Laval Titan Collège Français players
Living people
Los Angeles Kings players
Nashville Predators players
New York Islanders players
HC Dynamo Pardubice players
People from New Glasgow, Nova Scotia
Philadelphia Flyers players
Philadelphia Phantoms players
Pittsburgh Penguins players
San Antonio Rampage players
Sarnia Sting players
HC Slavia Praha players
Stanley Cup champions
Utah Grizzlies (AHL) players
Utah Grizzlies (IHL) players
Canadian expatriate ice hockey players in the Czech Republic
Canadian expatriate ice hockey players in Germany
Canadian expatriate ice hockey players in Switzerland
Canadian expatriate ice hockey players in the United States